"7-0-5" or "Seven-O-Five" or "705" is an instrumental composed by Glenn Miller in 1943. The instrumental was performed by the Army Air Force Orchestra under the leadership of Capt. Glenn Miller in 1943-1944 and in 1945 under Sgt. Jerry Gray.

Background

"7-0-5" was composed by Glenn Miller and arranged by Jerry Gray. The instrumental was performed with the Army Air Forces Training Command Band in several different versions and was recorded for release as a V-Disc. A V-Disc test pressing was made from the November 10, 1945, recording of "7-0-5" with the matrix code VP 375 D7TC-7335. The title "7-0-5" refers to the number of the score in the Glenn Miller music library. Each score had a number in the system that Miller and his arrangers devised. It was published as "Rock and Ride". The other titles that were used for the composition included "Goofin' Off" and "Jivin' the Blues". No title was decided upon so the score number was retained.

"7-0-5" was performed, recorded, and broadcast on the I Sustain the Wings radio program, Program No.15, on May 5, 1944, and on November 10, 1945. The May 5, 1944 Glenn Miller recording was on the 1996 album Glenn Miller: The Secret Broadcasts on RCA Victor. The instrumental also appeared on the 1995 compilation album Glenn Miller: The Missing Years. Volume One: American Patrol on the UK Avid Entertainment label. The 1945 version appeared on the 1992 UK album Major Glenn Miller's Army Air Forces Overseas Orchestra: American Patrol, Vol. II on Magic Records as DAWE55. The instrumental also appears on the 2012 CD and mp3 compilation album The Glenn Miller Band Honors US Troops by the WNTS Corporation. 

Larry O'Brien and the Glenn Miller Orchestra recorded the song on the 2006 album Steppin' Out. Wersiking recorded a version of the instrumental in 2009 on a Wersi Helios and Yamaha Tyros. The Glenn Miller Orchestra Scandinavia performed the song as part of the "Christmas Show with the Glenn Miller Orchestra" at Stockholm's Konserthus in Sweden in 2013. The Cornerstone Jazz Trio recorded the song in 2003 and released it on the album One for the Road featuring Larry O'Brien and Nick Hilscher. The Glenn Miller Orchestra under Nick Hilscher performed the instrumental at the 44th Annual Glenn Miller Festival in Clarinda, Iowa held from June 6-9, 2019.

"7-0-5" was featured on the December 4, 1943 Uncle Sam Presents radio program as a "ride-out" and again on February 5, 1944. Instrumentals were featured as closing songs after the main theme was performed. These were recorded together with the rest of each program and at the same session. The Uncle Sam Presents programs were recorded at NBC for the Office of War Information (OWI) and were broadcast for allied service personnel on the OWI "Voice of America" shortwave service and local OWI and Army radio globally.

Sources
Simon, George Thomas. Glenn Miller and His Orchestra. NY: Crowell, 1974.
Simon, George Thomas (1971). Simon Says. New York: Galahad. .
Flower, John. Moonlight Serenade: A Bio-discography of the Glenn Miller Civilian Band. New Rochelle, NY: Arlington House, 1972.

References

External links
May 5, 1944 recording of "7-0-5" by Glenn Miller and the Army Air Force Band for the Office of War Information (OWI).
I Sustain The Wings - First Song - "Seven Oh Five" November 11, 1945. RadioEchoes.

Glenn Miller songs
1944 songs
Jazz songs
Jazz compositions
1940s instrumentals